Mill Rock is an unincorporated community in Columbiana County, in the U.S. state of Ohio.

History
A stone watermill was built at the site of Mill Rock in 1808. A post office called Mill Rock was established in 1876, the name was changed to Millrock in 1895, and the post office closed in 1904.

References

Unincorporated communities in Columbiana County, Ohio
1808 establishments in Ohio
Unincorporated communities in Ohio